The Frigg UK System is a natural gas transportation system from the North Sea gas fields to St. Fergus near Peterhead in Scotland. It transports natural gas from the Alwyn North, Dunbar, Ellon, Grant, Nuggets, Frigg, Bruce, Ross, Captain, Buzzard, Tartan, Piper, Chanter, Galley, Hamish, Highlander, Ivanhoe, MacCulloch, Petronella, Saltire, and
Rob Roy, fields.

History
Construction of the main pipeline, the Frigg UK pipeline, started in 1974 and was completed in 1977. It was built to transport natural gas from the Frigg gas field to the United Kingdom. Because of technical limitations, it was decided to build two parallel pipelines, one (the Frigg UK pipeline) by the United Kingdom and one by Norway (former Frigg Norwegian Pipeline, now Vesterled).  Even in British waters, until 1998 both pipelines were in Norwegian jurisdiction.

Technical description
The system comprises the Frigg UK pipeline, Alwyn pipeline, other connection lines, and processing facilities at the St Fergus Gas Terminal. The Frigg UK System is operated by Total E&P UK Ltd.

References

Buildings and structures completed in 1977
Economy of Scotland
Energy infrastructure completed in 1977
Natural gas pipelines in the United Kingdom
North Sea energy
Norway–United Kingdom relations
TotalEnergies
Pipelines under the North Sea
1977 establishments in Scotland